= Sulphatara =

Sulphatara or Solfatara is an Italian term for a volcanic vent that releases gaseous substances containing sulfur.

It is also the name of a strain of bacteria that causes skin disease.
